L2O was a Chicago seafood restaurant opened in 2008 by chef Laurent Gras and owned and operated by Lettuce Entertain You Enterprises. The name of the restaurant stands for Lake to Ocean. The restaurant was located at 2300 N. Lincoln Park West, Chicago, IL 60614.

L2O and Alinea were the only restaurants in Chicago to receive 3 stars from the 2010 Michelin Guide. L2O earned 1 Michelin star in the 2011 guide and 2 stars in the 2012 guide.  
Matthew Kirkley became L2O's chef in November 2011. In 2012, the restaurant installed twin saltwater tanks that house live shellfish.    
The restaurant ceased to operate in December 2014.

See also
 List of seafood restaurants
 List of Michelin starred restaurants in Chicago

References

External links

Defunct restaurants in Chicago
Michelin Guide starred restaurants in Illinois
Restaurants established in 2008
Seafood restaurants in Illinois
Defunct seafood restaurants in the United States
2008 establishments in Illinois
2014 disestablishments in Illinois
Restaurants disestablished in 2014